Attorney General Kamal may refer to:

Fida M. Kamal (fl. 2000s), Attorney General of Bangladesh
Mustafa Kamal (judge) (1933–2015), Attorney General of Bangladesh

See also
Abdul Serry-Kamal (1954–2014), Attorney General of Sierra Leone